The following is a list of shopping centers located in the state of Minnesota. Minnesota is home to the first enclosed shopping mall in the United States, Southdale Center, as well as the largest in the country, Mall of America.

Current

Former

References 

 
Minnesota
Shopping malls